Roger Robinson may refer to:
 Roger Robinson (American football coach) (died 2004), American football player and coach
 Roger Robinson (actor) (1940–2018), American actor
 Roger Robinson (poet), writer and performer
 Roger Robinson (academic) (born 1939), British-born New Zealand academic, essayist, editor, runner, sportswriter and sports commentator
 Roger W. Robinson (1909–2010), cardiologist, educator and researcher